Asiana Airlines Flight 733 (OZ733, AAR733, registration HL7229) was a domestic Asiana Airlines passenger flight from Seoul-Gimpo International Airport (SEL at the time, now GMP) to Mokpo Airport (MPK), South Korea. The Boeing 737 crashed on July 26, 1993, in the Hwawon area of Haenam County, South Jeolla Province. The cause of the accident was determined to be pilot error leading to controlled flight into terrain. 68 of the 116 passengers and crew on board were killed.

Background

Aircraft 
The aircraft was a Boeing 737-5L9, which made its maiden flight on June 14, 1990. The aircraft was delivered to Maersk Air on June 26 the same year (with registration OY-MAB). The aircraft was then leased to Asiana Airlines on November 26, 1992.

Passengers and crew 
There were three Japanese nationals and two American nationals among the passengers, many of whom were vacationers heading for the popular summer resort there off the Yellow Sea, according to the airline. The captain was Hwang In-ki (Korean: 황인기, Hanja: 黃仁淇, RR: Hwang In-gi. M-R: Hwang In'gi), and the first officer was Park Tae-hwan (Korean: 박태환, Hanja: 朴台煥, RR: Bak Tae-hwan. M-R: Pak T'ae-hwan). There were four flight attendants on board.

Accident 
On July 26, 1993, flight 733 departed Gimpo International Airport in Seoul, bound for Mokpo Airport, for a scheduled arrival at 15:15. At that time, the weather conditions in Mokpo and Yeongam County area consisted of heavy rain and wind. However, the weather conditions were not enough to delay the arrival time. The flight planned to land on runway 06. The aircraft made its first landing attempt at 15:24, which failed, followed by a second landing attempt at 15:28, which also failed. At 15:38, after two failed landing attempts, the aircraft made a third attempt. The twin-engine plane then disappeared from the radar at 15:41. The news was reported by two surviving passengers who escaped from the wreckage and ran to the Hwawon-myeon branch of the village below the mountain.

Cause 
Asiana Airlines announced that after the accident, the plane was delayed by three landing attempts and that it appeared to have crashed. The runways did not have an ILS installed. Mokpo Airport was only equipped with VOR/DME, resulting in pilots performing excessive landing attempts in some cases, and was a contributing cause of the accident. A prosecution in charge of investigating the accident, announced that the aircraft had disappeared from the normal flight route, and pilots were likely to make an unintentional landing with a misunderstanding. Both pilots were killed in the crash. Chung Jong-hwan, the director general of the Ministry of Transportation, said that captain Hwang's actions caused the crash. An inquiry found pilot error was the cause of the crash when the plane began a descent while it was still passing over a mountain peak. The flight recorders were found and they recorded that after the third attempt, the crew told the control tower that the aircraft was veering off course. According to the cockpit voice recorder (CVR), captain Hwang flew the aircraft below the minimum safe altitude, as he said, "okay, eight hundred [feet]," a few seconds before impact.

Aftermath 
This was Asiana Airlines' first fatal (and as of 2022, deadliest) aircraft crash. After the accident, Asiana suspended the Gimpo - Mokpo route. The airline paid compensation to the families of the victims. In addition, at the time the transportation department was planning to build Muan International Airport in Muan County, Jeolla Province. When Muan International Airport was opened in 2007, Mokpo Airport was closed and converted into a military base. The accident also caused Asiana to cancel their order of Boeing 757-200s and instead order the Airbus A321.

Flight 733 was the deadliest aviation accident in South Korea at that time. It was surpassed by Air China Flight 129, which crashed on April 15, 2002, with 129 fatalities. It was also the deadliest accident involving a Boeing 737-500 at that time. It was surpassed by Aeroflot Flight 821, which crashed on September 14, 2008, with 88 fatalities. As of 2022, flight 733 remains the second deadliest crash in both of these categories.

Flight number 
Asiana Airlines still uses the flight number 733 on the late evening Seoul-Incheon - Hanoi route.

See also 
 Air China Flight 129
 American Airlines Flight 965
 Crossair Flight 3597
 Ground proximity warning system
 Korean Air Flight 801
Asiana Airlines Flight 214

Notes

References

External links 

 MBC News - Asiana Airlines Boeing 737 crash 


CVR transcript  

July 1993 events in Asia
1993 in South Korea
Aviation accidents and incidents in 1993
Airliner accidents and incidents involving controlled flight into terrain
Aviation accidents and incidents in South Korea
Man-made disasters in South Korea
Accidents and incidents involving the Boeing 737 Classic
Asiana Airlines accidents and incidents
Airliner accidents and incidents caused by pilot error
Airliner accidents and incidents caused by weather
1993 meteorology
1993 disasters in South Korea